DXMS (882 AM) Radyo Bida is a radio station owned and operated by Notre Dame Broadcasting Corporation, the media arm of the Missionary Oblates of Mary Immaculate. Its studio is located at the newly conglomerated Oblate Media Center, Sinsuat Ave., Cotabato City, and its transmitter is located at Notre Dame Village, Cotabato City.

DXMS is the oldest Catholic radio station in the country. It broadcasts programs relevant to the lives of the people of Mindanao as it regards the tri-people of Mindanao made up of Christians, Muslims and Lumads very important in achieving peace and development in the highly complicated Mindanao island of southern Philippines.

References

Radio stations in Cotabato City
Radio stations established in 1957
Missionary Oblates of Mary Immaculate